Aelurillus dubatolovi is a jumping spider species in the genus Aelurillus. The female was first identified by Galina Azarkina in 2003.

Description
Aelurillus dubatolovi is a small spider similar to Aelurillus ater, Aelurillus brutus and Aelurillus lutosus.

Distribution
The species lives in Central Asia.

References

Salticidae
Fauna of Kyrgyzstan
Fauna of Tajikistan
Spiders of Central Asia
Spiders described in 2003